The Clokes refers to a sporting dynasty in the sport of Australian rules football.

List
David Cloke (born 1955) - former Australian rules footballer
Jason Cloke (born 1982) - former Australian rules footballer, son of David
Cameron Cloke (born 1984) - former Australian rules footballer, son of David
Travis Cloke (born 1987) - Australian rules footballer, son of David